Australian industrial relations law maintains a system of compulsory arbitration in the settlement of industrial disputes between employers, employees, and their respective registered industrial associations.  Associations of employers or employees must be registered by the relevant Industrial Relations Commission in order to have disputes heard before that commission. However, in the Fair Work Commission individuals may appoint an unregistered/deregistered industrial organisation to represent them in any disputes.

For a variety of reasons, some industrial associations are not registered under their commission.
They may not meet the requirements for registration, may have had their registration revoked, or may have elected not to register.

The following are examples of deregistered or unregistered Australian unions that organisations of employee associations or groups which are not registered under State or Federal law as registered employee groups may have occurred due to a range of issues:

Retail and Fast Food Workers Union
Builders Labourers Federation
Unite Union
Industrial Workers of the World
Shearers and Rural Workers' Union
 National Jet Systems Pilots Group
 Queensland Power Workers' Association (now defunct) 
 Health Workers Union (Queensland)
 Queensland Prison Officers Association] (QPOA) "Prison Officers working for Prison Officers"

See also
Australian Council of Trade Unions
Australian Industrial Relations Commission
Australian labour law

Notes

Trade unions in Australia